Villa Stein is a building designed by Le Corbusier between 1926 and 1928 at Garches, France. The building is also known as Villa Garches, Villa de Monzie, and Villa Stein-de Monzie.

Located at 17 Rue de professeur Victor Pauchet, the villa was built for Gabrielle Colaco-Osorio de Monzie (1882–1961) and Sarah Stein, sister-in-law of American writer Gertrude Stein, between 1926 and 1928.

References

External links
 Villa Stein - Le Corbusier - Great Buildings Online
 Villa Stein - de Monzie - wikiarquitectura.com

Stein
Le Corbusier buildings in France
Houses completed in 1927
20th-century architecture in France